John Selo Morapedi (born 30 November 1976) is a South African long-distance runner. He competed in heat three of the men's 5000 metres at the 1996 Summer Olympics in Atlanta.

References

External links
 

1976 births
Living people
Athletes (track and field) at the 1996 Summer Olympics
South African male long-distance runners
Olympic athletes of South Africa
Place of birth missing (living people)